Marc Martínez Castillero (born 11 April 1986) is a Spanish footballer who plays as a central midfielder for CE Manresa.

Club career
Born in Barcelona, Catalonia, Martínez started playing football in FC Barcelona's youth system. In 2006, he joined Real Valladolid, spending his first years as a professional with the reserve team.

On 7 June 2008, Martínez signed a contract with UB Conquense. He continued to compete in the Segunda División B the following three seasons, with Águilas CF, CD Roquetas and UE Sant Andreu; in April 2012 he suffered a thigh injury, which ruled him out for the rest of the campaign.

Martínez moved to Segunda División side SD Huesca on 8 July 2012. He made his league debut on 17 August, coming off the bench for Antonio Núñez in the dying minutes of a 1–0 away win against CD Mirandés.

On 10 January 2013, Martínez was loaned to third division club Gimnàstic de Tarragona until the end of the season. He returned to Huesca in June, and on 6 July of the following year joined the former in a permanent deal.

On 14 August 2015, after achieving promotion to division two, Martínez terminated his contract with Gimnàstic, Hours later, he signed for neighbouring Lleida Esportiu.

On 5 July 2018, after one season apiece in the third tier with UE Llagostera and CE Sabadell FC, the 32-year-old Martínez returned to Lleida.

References

External links

1986 births
Living people
Spanish footballers
Footballers from Barcelona
Association football midfielders
Segunda División players
Segunda División B players
Tercera División players
FC Barcelona C players
Real Valladolid Promesas players
UB Conquense footballers
Águilas CF players
CD Roquetas footballers
UE Sant Andreu footballers
SD Huesca footballers
Gimnàstic de Tarragona footballers
Lleida Esportiu footballers
UE Costa Brava players
CE Sabadell FC footballers
CE Manresa players
Spain youth international footballers